NGC 133 is an open cluster in the constellation Cassiopeia. It was discovered by Heinrich d'Arrest on February 4, 1865.

References

External links 
 

Open clusters
Cassiopeia (constellation)
Astronomical objects discovered in 1865
0133